Vlado Strugar (28 December 1922 – 24 August 2019) was a Serbian historian and member of the Serbian Academy of Science and Arts, Montenegrin Academy of Sciences and Arts and Macedonian Academy of Sciences and Arts.

Strugar specialized in the history of the Communist Party of Yugoslavia.

References

External links 
 Biography on the website of SANU

1922 births
20th-century Serbian historians
Members of the Serbian Academy of Sciences and Arts
Members of the Montenegrin Academy of Sciences and Arts
2019 deaths
Yugoslav historians